Perfect is a 2018 American science fiction thriller film directed by Eddie Alcazar in his feature length debut and starring Garrett Wareing, Courtney Eaton, Tao Okamoto, Maurice Compte, and Abbie Cornish. The film had its premiere at South by Southwest on March 11, 2018. It was released in the United States on May 17, 2019.

Plot
A young man finds the corpse of his murdered girlfriend lying in the bed next to him. Having received a call from him, his mother takes him to a genetic-engineering clinic, where the patients transform their bodies and minds.

Cast
 Garrett Wareing as Vessel 13 
 Courtney Eaton as Sarah 
 Tao Okamoto as Ozawa 
 Maurice Compte as Dr. Price 
 Abbie Cornish as Mother 
 Martin Sensmeier as The Harvester
 Rainey Qualley as Perl
 Leonardo Nam as Haskell

Production
The film's working title was Puberty. The project was unveiled by Brainfeeder Films at the 2016 American Film Market. Part of the filming took place at the Sheats–Goldstein Residence in California. Flying Lotus wrote the score for the film.

Release
The film had its premiere at South by Southwest on March 11, 2018. SingularDTV subsequently acquired the worldwide rights to the film. It was released theatrically in the United States on May 17, 2019. It was released through video on demand on Breaker on June 21, 2019. In Scandinavia, the film was released on DVD and Blu-ray by Nonstop Entertainment in January 2020.

Reception
On Metacritic, the film has a weighted average score of 36 out of 100, based on reviews from 7 critics, indicating "generally unfavorable reviews".

Peter Sobczynski of RogerEbert.com gave the film 2 out of 4 stars, writing, "Eddie Alcazar's movie is ambitious enough, but it's the work of a would-be visionary without any clear vision." John DeFore of The Hollywood Reporter wrote: "While some will embrace the shards as a Shane Carruth-like brain-teaser, the movie is ultimately too reflective of its genetically-engineered subjects — soulless under an entrancing veneer." Amy Nicholson of Variety commented that Eddie Alcazar and Flying Lotus are "fixated on body horror, vanity, breaking good-taste boundaries, and blurring the lines between feature film, music video, and art installation." Chuck Bowen of Slant Magazine gave the film 1 out of 4 stars, writing, "Eddie Alcazar's Perfect is the sort of purposefully inscrutable, wandering, disconnected, symbolic, and highly precious mood bath that you'll either adore or loathe." Jeff Ewing of Forbes called it "surreal and complex, with the natural beauty of the surroundings alternating with body horror and psychedelic interludes."

References

External links
 
 

2018 films
2018 directorial debut films
Blockchain art
American science fiction thriller films
Films shot in California
2010s science fiction thriller films
2010s English-language films
2010s American films